Onyx Collective is a content brand owned and operated by Disney Entertainment, which primarily consists of projects from creators of color and other underrepresented groups. The brand was first launched on May 17, 2021, with several projects under development for Hulu, Disney+, and Star+.

Onyx Collective is currently led by Tara Duncan, who also served as the president of sister-network Freeform before shifting focus solely towards Onyx.

History 
In April 2021, Walt Disney Television chairman Dana Walden first mentioned the existence of a new BIPOC-focused programming initiative at Disney's General Entertainment Content division and Hulu. Following the official launch of the brand on May 17, 2021, Onyx announced a number of upcoming projects produced by notable black creators including Questlove, Oprah Winfrey, and Prentice Penny. Their first content acquisition, Summer of Soul, received a limited theatrical release in partnership with Searchlight Pictures on June 25, 2021, to critical acclaim before being released on Hulu the following weekend.

In September 2021, Onyx Collective and Hulu greenlit the legal drama Reasonable Doubt for a series order, marking the first scripted series from the brand.

Programming

Comedy

Drama

Documentaries

Docuseries

Feature films

References 

Disney Media Networks
Hulu
African-American television
2021 establishments in the United States